What Burns Never Returns is the third album by American math rock band Don Caballero. What Burns Never Returns was released on Touch and Go Records in 1998 and was a reunion of sorts for the band—it was their first album after a two-year hiatus and marked the return of the original line-up.

The album is notable for guitarist Ian Williams' first significant experimentation with pedals and other electronic effects. This style would be prevalent in both Williams' and the band's subsequent work.

It is the final studio album to feature guitarist Mike Banfield and bassist Pat Morris, both of whom were in the original line-up of Don Caballero.

Track listing

Track 5 is a medley of the songs "Trey Dog's Acid" and "Room Temperature Lounge", both of which were released as a seven-inch single on Touch and Go Records in 1997, then re-released on Singles Breaking Up (Vol. 1) in 1999.

Personnel
Don Caballero

Damon Che – drums, guitar (track 3, 8)
 Ian Williams – guitar
 Pat Morris – bass guitar
 Mike Banfield – guitar
Technical
 Al Sutton – producer
 Robert Ebeling – mixing
 Andy Vogt – photography, artwork

References

External links
TGRec.com What Burns Never Returns on Touch and Go Records

Don Caballero albums
1998 albums
Touch and Go Records albums